Callopistria floridensis, the Florida fern moth or Florida fern caterpillar, is a moth of the family Noctuidae. It is found from North America (including Alabama, California, Florida, Georgia, Iowa, Louisiana, New Brunswick, New Mexico, North Carolina, Ohio, Oklahoma, Ontario, Pennsylvania, South Carolina, Tennessee and Texas), south through the Caribbean (including Cuba), Mexico and Central America (including Costa Rica) to Ecuador.

Adults are on wing year round in Florida and the tropics.

The larvae feed on various ferns, including Nephrolepis exaltata and Pteris vittata. They are highly variable in coloration, ranging from green to brown, black or reddish. It is an occasional pest in greenhouses.  The larvae were recently discovered to have high levels of arsenic when feeding on P. vittata, and are the only known terrestrial animal to accumulate arsenic.

References

Caradrinini
Moths of North America
Moths of South America
Moths described in 1852